South Asia Institute of Advanced Christian Studies (SAIACS ), is an ecumenical institution governed by members of mainline Episcopal churches for post-graduate studies in Bangalore, India. The motto of SAIACS is: "Excellence for service."

History
SAIACS was founded in 1982, by Graham Houghton and fellow New Zealander, Bruce Nicholls. Initially, the college offered a two-year Master of Theology (MTh) programme in Missiology which was offered under the umbrella of the Association of Evangelical Theological Education in India (AETEI), in partnership with Madras Bible Seminary in Chennai (formerly, Madras). In the year 1983 the programme was moved permanently to Bangalore and sought and received accreditation from Asia Theological Association (ATA) under its own name. 

SAIACS offers degrees within several specialisations accommodating more than 100 students on campus each year. SAIACS  has one of the largest theological library in India with thousands of volumes. SAIACS is now a largely residential research institute and offers postgraduate degree programmes for an MA, M.Div., M.Th., Doctor of Ministry (D.Min.), Doctor of Missiology (DMiss) and Doctor of Philosophy (Ph.D.). Currently there are four departmental specialisations being offered at SAIACS; namely, Biblical Studies (New Testament and Old Testament), Missiology, Practical Theology and Study of Religions.

SAIACS also provides cohort based D.Min programs where students can earn a fully accredited degree from Asbury Theological Seminary.

Leadership
The first principal of SAIACS was Graham Houghton.https://www.leadev-langham.org/dr-graham-houghton In 2004, Ashish Chrispal took over as principal. He was followed by F. Hrangkhuma as Principal from 2006-2008, Dr. Ian Payne, from 2008-2018. The current principal is Dr. Prabhu Singh. The SAIACS Trust oversees the functioning of SAIACS.

Location

SAIACS main campus is located in Kothanur, North Bangalore, in the state Karnataka, in India. Its Mysore campus is located in 1st Phase, Kuvempunagar, Mysuru, in the state Karnataka, in India.

Accreditation and partnership

SAIACS degrees are accredited by Asia Theological Association. 

In June 1997, SAIACS was recognized by the University of Mysore as an accredited research institution of the university where students can enroll for a Ph.D. program under University of Mysore.

In June 2011, it marked the coming together of Ravi Zacharias International Ministries (RZIM) and SAIACS, with the establishing of the RZIM Chair of Apologetics at SAIACS.

In June 2011, the University of Mysore further recognized SAIACS as a Centre for Specialized Studies to offer MA in Theology where students can graduate with MA degree from the University of Mysore after writing Mysore University examination.

Similarly, in June 2012, the MPhil programme, which is identical to the MTh programme, was recognised by the University of Mysore.

In June 2013, Asbury Theological Seminary (Kentucky/Florida, US) seminary signed a Memorandum of Understanding (MoU) with SAIACS to "facilitate greater partnership between the two institutions. The partnership involves students and faculty exchange, resources sharing and joint classroom interaction."

In June 2022, a Memorandum of Understanding (MoU) was signed Asbury Theological Seminary to offer the Doctor of Ministry degree, focusing on leadership in ministry where students can graduate with a D.Min. from Asbury Seminary.

Academic programs

SAIACS offers residential degree programs under Asbury Seminary and ATA for 
 Masters of Arts in Christianity (MA), 
 Master of Divinity (M.Div), 
 Master of Theology (M.Th.), 
 Doctor of Missiology (D.Miss.), 
 Doctor of Philosophy (Ph.D.), 
 and a non-residential Doctor of Ministry (D.Min.).

The residency requirement for the M.A. and the M.Th. programs is two academic years. This period may be extended where equivalency course requirements are added to a student's M.Th. program. Doctoral programs involve longer periods.

The online program at SAIACS has the same academic content as the residency program, except that the students listen to pre-recorded lectures and can extend the program with a flexible time frame. Each module in the online programs has the same home works, group assignments, discussion, research papers and evaluation as the modules in residency program in addition to personal faculty interaction and office hours via online portal.

Students

Most students to SAIACS are sent by their supporting church or organisation and are already under appointment to continue their service upon completion of their studies at SAIACS. Most of the students have served as ordained ministers, theological teachers or Christian workers in churches in Asia. SAIACS has trained students from countries like Australia, Bhutan, Brazil, Canada, China, Guatemala, Hong Kong, Indonesia, Kenya, Korea, Malaysia, Mauritius, Nepal, New Zealand, Nigeria, Sri Lanka, Sudan, Thailand, and USA.

SAIACS Press

SAIACS Press is the publishing arm of SAIACS, and it aims to publish research that challenge the church in South Asia. Most of its publications are written or revised for India. There are primarily two types of publications; the Dome Series and the Spire Series. The Dome Series publications are scholarly works. Spire Series books are more popular guides to Christian thought and living.

SAIACS CEO Centre

In 2005, the Continuing Education Opportunities Centre (or CEO Centre) was started at SAIACS with the aim to generate scholarships for deserving SAIACS students. The CEO Centre is a premium conference centre and management training site, built right next to SAIACS.

References

External links
 Official Site of SAIACS
 Publications of SAIACS

Seminaries and theological colleges in India
Christian universities and colleges in India
India